Ada "Ace" Vélez (born September 15, 1969) is a Puerto Rican female professional boxer from Dania Beach, Florida who lives in Miami. Vélez was brought into boxing by former women's boxing world champion Bonnie Canino.

After a successful undefeated amateur career that included a national title, Vélez became the first Puerto Rican to win a women's world boxing championship on January 19, 2001, when she defeated Kathy Williams on a unanimous decision over 10 rounds to win the IBA bantamweight title. Ten months later, she moved up in weight and challenged undefeated Mary Elizabeth Ortega for the WIBA super bantamweight title, again winning a 10-round unanimous decision.

Vélez won her first 10 pro fights before suffering her first loss as a professional, in her first defense of the WIBA title. On June 21, 2002, Melissa Del Valle decisioned Vélez in Waco, Texas in the featured bout on an all-women's card featuring world champions Anne Wolfe, Sumya Anani, Delia Gonzalez and Kelsey Jeffries.

On December 21, she bounced back to reclaim the IBA version of the world bantamweight title by decisioning Lakeysha Williams over 10 rounds.

Vélez has added the WIBA bantamweight title to her IBA belt on June 28, 2003, when she beat Gonzalez on a seventh-round disqualification.

Vélez traveled to Denmark to defend her WIBA bantamweight title against Anita Christensen. on January 17, 2004, Vélez lost a highly controversial 10 round split decision to Christensen.
Vélez had knocked down Christensen in the 9th round, and looked to be the obvious winner of their encounter. The Danish press strongly criticized this decision, saying on record that Vélez was robbed of her title.

Vélez' current record is 20 wins, 5 loss and 3 draws, with six knockout wins.

She now teaches kids, teens, and adults boxing at Velez Boxing and Fitness in Oakland Park, Florida. She makes them do exercise machines, running, strength and conditioning, and boxing.

Professional boxing record

See also

List of Puerto Ricans
History of women in Puerto Rico

References

External links
 

1969 births
Living people
Puerto Rican women boxers
Bantamweight boxers
People from Dania Beach, Florida
21st-century American women
Sportspeople from Broward County, Florida
Boxers from Florida